EWWL League for the season 2002–03 was the second season of the WABA League. Attended by eight teams from four countries, a champion for the first time in history, became the team Željezničar Sarajevo. In this season participating clubs from Bosnia and Herzegovina, Croatia, Slovenia and from Austria.

Team information

Regular season
The League of the season was played with 8 teams and play a dual circuit system, each with each one game at home and away. The four best teams at the end of the regular season were placed in the Final Four.

Final four
Final Four to be played 24 and 25 January 2003 in the Dvorana Mirza Delibašić in Sarajevo, Bosnia and Herzegovina.

Awards
Finals MVP: Mirna Deak of Željezničar Sarajevo

External links
 2002-03 EWWL league
 2002-03 EWWL league

2002-03
2002–03 in European women's basketball leagues
2002–03 in Bosnia and Herzegovina basketball
2002–03 in Slovenian basketball
2002–03 in Austrian basketball
2002–03 in Croatian basketball